Richard La Nicca (16 August 1794 in Safien-Neukirch – 27 August 1883 in Chur) was a Swiss engineer known as the pioneering planner and implementer of the Jura water correction project in the Swiss Jura.

Originating from Sarn and Chur, La Nicca was the son of Christian La Nicca, a pastor of Safien, Neukirch and Tenna, and Anna Gredig.

Career 
In 1809 La Nicca was at Canton School Chur. as a lieutenant in the Swiss regiment of Victor Emanuel I. in Piedmont.

1816–18 Student of technical sciences at the University of Tübingen.

In 1818-21 he was Assistant to Giulio L. Pocobellis in the construction of the “Kommerzialstrasse” on the San Bernardino and in this function and others involved in the construction of the important "Ponte Vittorio Emanuele", south of the pass. Under his leadership, a new road was constructed at the Viamala with a tunnel and gallery which avoided the ascent over the Rongeller Höhe. The three existing bridges were incorporated in the road, with a new route cut through the rock in between.

In 1822–23, after a year of study at the University of Munich, he became in 1823 the first Canton of Graubünden chief engineer, a position he held until 1853. During those years he supervised the construction of important pass roads in Graubünden  (Julier, Maloja, Bernina), and the rebuilding of settlements totally destroyed by natural catastrophes (Neu-Felsberg), as from 1843) or village fires (Thusis-Neudorf), as from 1845).

In 1826 he worked on the project of the Rhine correction in Domleschg valley (finalized in 1832). As from 1831 he signed as the director of the building of St. Luzisteig fortifications, responsible for statics and strengthening.

In 1837 he was a co-founder of the  Swiss Engineers and Architects Association.

In 1839 he designed the first project for a railway line on the Splügenpass;

In 1845 he involved himself in Alpine rail planning for the lower Lukmanier.

From 1840–63 he served as engineer on the Linth Commission,

From 1840–42, he projected the 1st Jura water correction (finalised 1868–91).

In 1847 he participated in the Sonderbund war as a military chief engineer in Canton Ticino, and then as Federal Colonel in the Génie troops.

In 1853 he was technical director of the Südostbahn Rorschach-Chur.

From 1858–71 he unsuccessfully urged a merger of railroad companies to form a railway line from Fluelen to Disentis and from Chur to Disentis through the Lukmanier, as an alternative to the Gotthard line.

References
Richard L., 2006
D. Speich, «Richard L. (1794-1883)», in "Schweizer Pioniere der Wirtschaft und Technik 82, 2006, 59–66"

Swiss engineers
1794 births
1883 deaths
People from Chur